An election to Westmeath County Council took place on 20 June 1985 as part of that year's Irish local elections. 23 councillors were elected from five electoral divisions by PR-STV voting for an eight-year term of office.

Results by party

Results by Electoral Area

Athlone

Coole

Kilbeggan

Mullingar Lough Owel

Mullingar Urban

External links

 Official website
 irishelectionliterature

1985 Irish local elections
1985